Tatiana Vladimirovna Andreeva, later Sharkina (born 13 June 1970) is a former competitive figure skater for the Soviet Union. She is the 1985 World Junior champion. She is an ISU judge in single and pair skating for Russia.

Competitive highlights

References

Navigation

Russian female single skaters
Soviet female single skaters
Living people
Figure skaters from Saint Petersburg
World Junior Figure Skating Championships medalists
1970 births